Lincang is a prefecture-level city located in the southwest of Yunnan province, People's Republic of China.

History 
Lincang was previously called Baihuai during the Shang dynasty.

On December 26, 2003, the state council approved the cancellation of Lincang District and set up prefecture-level Lincang city.

Geography and climate

Lincang covers latitude 23° 05′－25° 02′ N and longitude 98° 40′－100° 33′ E, thus straddling the Tropic of Cancer in the southern part of its administrative area, or prefecture. It is situated on the middle to lower reaches of the Mekong, known as the Lancang in China, and the Salween, or the Nu. Bordering prefectures are Pu'er to the southeast, and Baoshan and Dali to the northwest. It also borders Burma's Shan State.

Located at an altitude of above  and within 30 arc minutes to the north of the Tropic of Cancer, Lincang has a mild subtropical highland climate (Köppen Cwb), bordering on a humid subtropical climate (Köppen Cwa), with muddled distinction between the seasons and daytime temperatures remaining warm year-round. Highs peak in May before the core of the rainy season and reach a minimum in December; however, the warmest and coolest months are June and January respectively. With monthly percent possible sunshine ranging from 22% in July to 73% in January, the city receives 2,105 hours of bright sunshine annually.

Subdivisions

Demography
Lincang is the mountainous home of the Wa ethnic minority and was historically seen as too "wild" to be worth settling by neighboring powers, notably British Burma and ancient China. This may have had some connection to the Wa's image as head-hunters.

Natural resources
Mineral resources mined and extracted in the Lincang area include coal (including waste coal ash), germanium and uranium.  Lincang is also home to the world's oldest cultivated tea tree, some 3,200 years old, in the village of Jinxiu, Xiaowan town, of Fengqing County.

Transport
Lincang Airport
Dali–Lincang railway

References

External links
Lincang City Official Website

 
Cities in Yunnan